Sergei Konstantinovich Godunov (born July 17, 1929) is a Soviet and Russian professor at the Sobolev Institute of Mathematics of the Russian Academy of Sciences in Novosibirsk, Russia.

Biography
Godunov's most influential work is in the area of applied and numerical mathematics, particularly in the development of methodologies used in Computational Fluid Dynamics (CFD) and other computational fields. Godunov's theorem (Godunov, 1959) (also known as Godunov's order barrier theorem) : Linear numerical schemes for solving partial differential equations, having the property of not generating new extrema (a monotone scheme), can be at most first-order accurate. Godunov's scheme is a conservative numerical scheme for solving partial differential equations. In this method, the conservative variables are considered as piecewise constant over the mesh cells at each time step and the time evolution is determined by the exact solution of the Riemann (shock tube) problem at the inter-cell boundaries (Hirsch, 1990).

On 1–2 May 1997 a symposium entitled: Godunov-type numerical methods, was held at the University of Michigan to honour Godunov. These methods are widely used to compute continuum processes dominated by wave propagation. On the following day, 3 May, Godunov received an honorary degree from the University of Michigan.

Education
1946-1951 - Department of Mechanics and Mathematics, Moscow State University.
1951 - Diploma (M. S.), Moscow State University.
1954 - Candidate of Physical and Mathematical Sciences (Ph. D.).
1965 - Doctor of Physical and Mathematical Sciences (D. Sc.).
1976 - Corresponding member of the USSR Academy of Sciences.
1994 - Member of the Russian Academy of Sciences (Academician).
1997 - Honorary professor of the University of Michigan (Ann-Arbor, USA).

Awards
1959 – Lenin Prize.
1972 – A.N. Krylov Prize of the USSR Academy of Sciences.
1993 – M.A. Lavrentiev Prize of the Russian Academy of Sciences.

See also
Riemann solver
Total variation diminishing
Upwind scheme

Notes

References
Godunov, Sergei K. (1954), Ph. D. Dissertation: Difference Methods for Shock Waves, Moscow State University.
Godunov, S. K. (1959), A Difference Scheme for Numerical Solution of Discontinuous Solution of Hydrodynamic Equations, Mat. Sbornik, 47, 271-306, translated US Joint Publ. Res. Service, JPRS 7225 Nov. 29, 1960.
Godunov, Sergei K. and Romenskii, Evgenii I. (2003) Elements of Continuum Mechanics and Conservation Laws, Springer, .
Hirsch, C. (1990), Numerical Computation of Internal and External Flows, vol 2, Wiley.

External links

Godunov's Personal Web Page
Sobolev Institute of Mathematics

1929 births
20th-century Russian mathematicians
Living people
Corresponding Members of the USSR Academy of Sciences
Full Members of the Russian Academy of Sciences
Moscow State University alumni
Lenin Prize winners
Recipients of the Order of Honour (Russia)
Recipients of the Order of the Red Banner of Labour
Fluid dynamicists
Numerical analysts
Soviet mathematicians